Vahdat Rural District is a rural district (dehestan) in the Central District of Zarand County, Kerman Province, Iran. At the 2006 census, its population was 15,033, in 3,609 families. The rural district has 21 villages.

References 

Rural Districts of Kerman Province
Zarand County